Jailbirds (French: La Taularde) is a 2015 French-Belgian drama film written and directed by Audrey Estrougo and starring Sophie Marceau.

Plot 
When her husband, a career criminal, is arrested and faces maybe ten years in jail, Mathilde smuggles him a gun which he uses to escape. She is caught, and faces maybe two years in prison, while he is on the run as a wanted man facing further charges. Life locked up awaiting trial is tough and Mathilde, without any clue where her husband has got to, starts crumbling under the strain. When a prisoner is knifed and uproar breaks out, she picks up the knife and threatens a guard. Disarmed, she faces a further charge and is told with relish by the chief warder that her husband has been found dead in the boot of a car.

Cast 

 Sophie Marceau as Mathilde Leroy
 Suzanne Clément as Anita Lopes
 Anne Le Ny as Marthe Brunet
 Eye Haïdara as Nato Kanté
 Marie-Sohna Condé as Elise Schoeicher
 Carole Franck as Babette
 Marie Denarnaud as Léa
 Naidra Ayadi as Robocop
 Anne Coesens as Noémie
 Pauline Burlet as Jeanne
 Nailia Harzoune as Linda Plancher
 Aurore Broutin as Safia Dakro
 Alice Belaïdi as Samira Belhadj
 Benjamin Siksou as Adrien Leroy
 Julie Gayet as Nadège Rutter
 Nicolas Gob as Marcus

References

External links 
 
 

2015 films
2010s French-language films
French drama films
Belgian drama films
Films set in prison
2015 drama films
French-language Belgian films
2010s French films